The list of Greek players that either play or have played in the  National Basketball Association (NBA):

Currently active NBA players

Former NBA players

Drafted but did not play in the NBA

All the drafted players

NBA champions

Former NBA All-Star Game participants

Former NBA All-Star Game Contest participants

See also 
 NBA Draft
 List of National Basketball Association players by country

External links 
 International players who have played in the NBA
 International players who have been drafted but have never played in the NBA
 Superbasket.gr list 
 E-tipos.com 
 Doubleteam.wordpress.com 

Nba
Nba
Greek Nba